Darklands or Dark Lands can refer to:

Films
 Darklands (film), a 1996 Welsh horror film
 Darkland (2017 film), a 2017 Danish film

Games
 Darklands (video game), a computer role-playing game by Microprose
 Dark Lands (video game), a video game by Mingle Games
 Dark Lands, a location in the Games Workshop's fictional Warhammer Fantasy setting

Literature
 Darklands Trilogy, a series of books by Anthony Eaton
 Darklands, a fictional realm in the gamebook series Lone Wolf
 Dark Land, a continent in stories of J. R. R. Tolkien

Music
 Darklands (album), a 1987 album by The Jesus and Mary Chain
 "Darklands" (song), a song and 1987 single by The Jesus and Mary Chain